Wellington Bezerra da Silva (born 19 June 1988) is a Brazilian long-distance runner. In 2019, he competed in the men's marathon at the 2019 World Athletics Championships held in Doha, Qatar. He finished in 44th place.

In 2014, he won the gold medal in the men's senior race (12 km) at the 2014 South American Cross Country Championships held in Asunción, Paraguay.

In 2019, he competed in the men's marathon event at the 2019 Pan American Games held in Lima, Peru. He finished in 11th place with a time of 2:17:33.

References

External links 
 

Living people
1988 births
Place of birth missing (living people)
Brazilian male long-distance runners
Brazilian male marathon runners
World Athletics Championships athletes for Brazil
Pan American Games athletes for Brazil
Athletes (track and field) at the 2019 Pan American Games
20th-century Brazilian people
21st-century Brazilian people